Joseph Thomas McGucken (March 13, 1902 – October 6, 1983) was an American prelate of the Roman Catholic Church. He served as an auxiliary bishop of the Archdiocese of Los Angeles (1941–1955), coadjutor bishop and bishop of the Diocese of Sacramento (1955–1962) and archbishop of the Archdiocese of San Francisco (1962–1977).

Biography

Early life 
Joseph McGucken was born on March 13, 1902, in Los Angeles, California, to Joseph A. and Mary Agnes (née Flynn) McGucken. He attended Polytechnic High School in his native city. He studied engineering at the University of California, Los Angeles for two years before beginning his studies for the priesthood at St. Patrick's Seminary in Menlo Park. He continued his studies at the Pontifical North American College in Rome, where he obtained a Doctor of Divinity degree in 1928.

Priesthood 
While in Rome, he was ordained a priest for what was then the Diocese of Los Angelese-San Diego on January 15, 1928.

Following his return to Los Angeles, he served as secretary to Archbishop John Joseph Cantwell from 1929 to 1938. He was named a papal chamberlain by Pope Pius XI in 1937, and served as chancellor of the Archdiocese of Los Angeles from 1938 to 1948. He was raised by Pope Pius XII to the rank of domestic prelate in 1939.

Auxiliary Bishop of Los Angeles 
On February 4, 1941, McGucken was appointed Auxiliary Bishop of Los Angeles and Titular Bishop of Sanavus by Pope Pius XII. He received his episcopal consecration on March 19, 1941, from Archbishop Cantwell, with Bishops Daniel Gercke and Philip George Scher serving as co-consecrators. In addition to his episcopal duties, McGucken served as pastor at St. Andrew's Parish in Pasadena, California, (1944–1955) and vicar general of the archdiocese (1948–1955).

Coadjutor Bishop and Bishop of Sacramento 
Pius XII named McGucken as coadjutor bishop of the Diocese of Sacramento on October 26, 1955. St. Andrew's parish gave McGucken a farewell celebration at the Pasadena Civic Auditorium, with performances by singer Dennis Day, several choirs, and a US Army color guard. 

When Bishop Robert Armstrong died on January 14, 1957, McGucken automatically succeeded him. In his five years as bishop, he authorized, built or approved for development nine parishes, three high schools, 33 new church buildings and one minor seminary.

Archbishop of San Francisco 
On February 19, 1962, McGucken was appointed Archbishop of San Francisco; he was installed on April 3, 1962.

In 1962 the existing St. Mary's Cathedral, built in 1891, was destroyed by fire. McGucken gathered his consultants to begin the process of planning and constructing a new Cathedral of St. Mary.  Architectural critic Allan Temko advocated a bold, new cathedral that would reflect San Francisco's status as a major international urban center. McGucken added two internationally known architects to his team, Italian-born Pietro Belluschi from the Massachusetts Institute of Technology, who was placed in charge of designs, and Pier Luigi Nervi, an engineer from Rome, who took over structural concerns. The strikingly modern design which was presented was met with high praise and has been called the "first cathedral truly of our time and in harmony with the liturgical reforms of the Council."

In 1966, McGucken publicly voiced his support for the efforts of Cesar Chávez to organize farmworkers in California's vineyards. McGucken's stand led one vineyard spokesman to warn that "the Church leaders had better start looking for other financial means to carry out their radical theories."

Retirement and legacy 
On February 16, 1977, Pope Paul VI accepted McGucken's resignation as Archbishop of San Francisco.  Thomas McGucken died on October 6, 1983. He is buried in the Archbishops' Crypt at Holy Cross Cemetery in Colma, California.

In 1994, Terence McAteer made public an accusation that he was raped in 1967 by Rev. Austin Peter Keegan, a priest in the archdiocese, when he was ten years old.  McAteer had reported the rape in 1976 to Reverend Vincent Ring, who informed McGucken.  Three years later, Keegan sexually assaulted another boy.

Clashes with Fr Eugene Boyle 

Father Eugene Boyle was a priest directly under McGucken's authority in San Francisco during McGucken's administration as Archbishop. While not antagonistic to Boyle (in fact the two always remained respectful of each other), Boyle and McGucken did clash over a number of issues. Boyle was an explicitly progressive priest during the 1960s and 1970s, spurred on by the developments of the Second Vatican Council. Boyle campaigned on behalf of San Francisco's African American community as well as engaging with the American Civil Rights Movement.  He also supported the United Farm Workers and The Black Panther Party. 

McGurken did not oppose the right of priests such as Boyle to support social justice movements.  However, when Boyle was involved in a number of controversies and conservative sections of the Californian public pushed back against him , McGucken tried to err on the side of caution and sided against Boyle. The back and forth between Boyle and McGucken would dominate much of McGucken's term as archbishop.

See also
 Roman Catholic Archdiocese of San Francisco

Notes

Further reading
 Burns, Jeffrey M. "Postconciliar Church as Unfamiliar Sky: The Episcopal Styles of Cardinal James F. McIntyre and Archbishop Joseph T. McGucken." US Catholic Historian 17.4 (1999): 64-82 online.
 Weber, Francis J. Archbishop Joseph T McGucken (1902-1983): A Personal Memoir (Mission Hills: Archival Center, 1996).

Episcopal succession

UCLA Henry Samueli School of Engineering and Applied Science alumni
Roman Catholic archbishops of San Francisco
Roman Catholic bishops of Sacramento
Participants in the Second Vatican Council
20th-century Roman Catholic archbishops in the United States
People from Los Angeles
Roman Catholic Archdiocese of Los Angeles
1902 births
1983 deaths